Wasted Youth were an English post-punk band from London, England, active between 1979 and 1982, which blended post-punk/pre-Goth with dark acoustic strains of the sort associated with Nick Drake and Syd Barrett. The line-up of the band was Ken Scott (vocals and guitar), Rocco Barker (guitar), Nick Nicole (synth), Darren Murphy (bass) and Andy Scott (drums). Their records were released through Bridgehouse Records, a label set up by the bass player's father, former boxer Terry Murphy.

Wasted Youth emerged from the Plaistow power pop trio The Tickets who were fronted by Ken Scott with brother Andy on Drums and John McGeady on bass.

Rocco Barker went on to join the band Flesh for Lulu and was in the Channel 4 show, A Place in Spain: Costa Chaos.

The band's bassist, Darren Murphy, died of cancer on 15 February 2012.
The band's drummer, Andy Scott, also of Cockney Rejects fame, died of cancer on 29 May 2020.

In October 2021, Ken Scott and Rocco Barker announced that they were reviving Wasted Youth. The first shows for the reformed band sold out within hours of going on sale. Wasted Youth were special guests on the Psychedelic Furs UK tour in April and have recently played the PowerHaus in Camden and the Oslo in Hackney. The current line-up is Ken Scott on vocals and synth, Rocco Barker on guitar and backing vocals, Alan Temple (from The Low Gods) on drums, TC(Teresa Casella)(Miranda Sex Garden) on bass, and Josef Rosam (from Dorothy Valens) on guitar and synth. 

Wasted Youth have a tour starting in March 2023 and some festival appearances lined-up for summer. The newly formed WY Records are planning to have some vinyl and CD releases ready for March 2023. And that's something to look forward to.

Discography

Singles
 "Paris, France" (released under pseudonym "Tom Lucy")

Albums

References

External links
 Bridgehouse Records

English post-punk music groups
English gothic rock groups
English punk rock groups
Musical groups from London